Uhornyky is a village of the Ivano-Frankivsk Raion, Ivano-Frankivsk Oblast, in Western Ukraine. It belongs to Ivano-Frankivsk urban hromada, one of the hromadas of Ukraine. 

The village is located just east of Ivano-Frankivsk, separated from the city by the river Bystrytsia of Nadvirna. South of it is located the village of Mykytyntsi, while in the north Uhornyky borders with a village of Pidluzhia. East of the village is located a village of the Pidpechary.

Until 18 July 2020, Uhornyky belonged to Ivano-Frankivsk Municipality. The municipality was abolished in July 2020 as part of the administrative reform of Ukraine, which reduced the number of raions of Ivano-Frankivsk Oblast to six. The area of Ivano-Frankivsk Municipality was merged into Ivano-Frankivsk Raion.

Personalities
 Stepan Vytvytskyi (1884–1965), the president of Ukrainian People's Republic in exile, lawyer, journalist, member of the Ukrainian National-Democratic Party.

References

Villages in Ivano-Frankivsk Raion